Reza Motorcyclist (Persian title: Reza Motori; ; English title alternative: Reza, the Motorcyclist) is a 1970 Iranian drama film directed by Masoud Kimiai and starring Behrouz Vossoughi, Fariba Khatami, Mahmoud Tehrani, Jalal Pishvaian, Parvin Malakouti and Bahman Mofid. This film references Hollywood themes with a "noble rogue" character, which was common in 1970s Iranian films.

Cast 
 Behrouz Vossoughi - Reza Motorcyclist
 Fariba Khatami - Farangis
 Hamideh Kheirabadi - Farangis's mother
 Parvin Malakouti - Reza's mother
 Bahman Mofid - Abbas Ghorazeh

References

External links

1970 films
1970 crime drama films
1970s Persian-language films
Films directed by Masoud Kimiai
Iranian black-and-white films
1970s heist films
Films shot in Tehran